The Constitution (Amendment No. 27) Act 1936 was an amendment to the Constitution of the Irish Free State that removed all reference to the King, to the office of Governor-General, and almost completely eliminated the King's constitutional role in the state. Under the Act most of the functions previously performed by the King and his Governor-General were transferred to various other organs of the Irish government. The only role retained by the King was as representative of the state in foreign affairs. The amendment passed through the Oireachtas at the same time as the External Relations Act, becoming law on 11 December 1936. Its long title was:

Due to deficiencies in the External Relations Act, the Executive Powers (Consequential Provisions) Act 1937 was passed in the following year to finally eliminate the office of Governor-General.

Timing
The opportunity for this amendment arose because the Irish Free State was then a member of the Commonwealth, and each of its members had to assent to the abdication of Edward VIII on 10 December 1936. The amendment was passed before the passing of the Executive Authority (External Relations) Act 1936 on 12 December which assented to the abdication. The policy of the Irish government was to reduce any remaining British links in the political system of the Irish Free State and to turn it into a republic.

Transfer of royal competences
After the adoption of the Act the duties usually performed by a head of state were distributed among a number of organs. Most importantly, the power to exercise the executive authority was vested explicitly in the Executive Council (cabinet), the right to appoint the President of the Executive Council (prime minister) was transferred to Dáil Éireann (the sole house of the Oireachtas or parliament), and the duty of promulgating the law was vested in the Ceann Comhairle, chairman of the Dáil. The King retained only a role in foreign affairs.

Governor-General
The Act purported to abolish the office of Governor-General. However Éamon de Valera was advised by his Attorney-General, James Geoghegan, the Secretary to the Executive Council, Maurice Moynihan, and Mr Matheson of the Parliamentary Draftsman's office that that Act did not actually abolish the office as it had an existence independent of the Constitution; to conclusively abolish the office, a blanket transfer of any remaining powers of the Governor-General would be necessary, and remaining references to the Governor-Generalship would need to be removed from Acts of the Oireachtas. In May 1937 de Valera introduced the Executive Powers (Consequential Provisions) Act 1937 to do just that, as well as to validate the installation of the Chief Justice of the Supreme Court, who had failed (or declined) to make the legally required declaration of office in front of the Governor-General, and to validate the appointment of a new Attorney-General, who under existing law could only be appointed by the Governor-General.

Foreign affairs
After the enactment of the Act, the King was no longer specifically mentioned in the Constitution. However, the amendment introduced a new provision that, without explicitly referring to the King, allowed the state to continue to use him as its representative in foreign affairs by passing a law allowing him to perform this function. A law for this purpose, the External Relations Act, was passed shortly after the amendment was enacted. Thus, after December 1936 treaties continued to be signed in the name of the King, and the King continued to accredit Irish ambassadors and high commissioners and to receive the Letters of Credence of foreign diplomats. The provision allowing the King to do this was inserted in Article 51 and read:

The current Constitution of Ireland enacted in 1937, created the position of President of Ireland as head of state, but did not give the position any external functions. The External Relations Act thus created, for a number of years, a situation in which it was unclear whether the King remained the head of state for external purposes. This situation came to an end in 1949 when the Republic of Ireland Act came into force, removing the King's role in foreign affairs and making the President of Ireland  head of state for all purposes. This new status was celebrated by President Seán T. O'Kelly paying the first ever state visit by an Irish president abroad.

Expiry
The Amendment became obsolete on the repeal of the 1922 Constitution on the adoption of the Constitution of Ireland in 1937, and was repealed as spent law by the Statute Law Revision Act 2016.

See also
History of the Republic of Ireland
Head of state of Ireland (1936 to 1949)

References

External links
Text of the Act from Irish Statute Book

1936 in Irish law
Acts of the Oireachtas of the 1930s
Abdication of Edward VIII
Government in the Irish Free State
Monarchy in the Irish Free State
1936 in international relations
Governors-General of the Irish Free State
Amendments to the Constitution of the Irish Free State